Turner House Gallery is an art gallery in Penarth, near Cardiff, Wales.

Details
The gallery was built in 1887/8, designed by architect Edwin Seward in a Queen Anne style for the rich local flour merchant, James Pyke Thompson. Pyke Thompson used the gallery to exhibit his collection of artworks, which include drawings, etchings, and ceramics, by artists including Rembrandt, with free entry to the public. The collection notably includes paintings by J. M. W. Turner, after which the gallery was named.

Turner House Gallery was acquired by the National Museum of Wales in 1921 and used to display the museum's secondary public art collection.

The building was given Grade II listed status in 1993.

In 2003 Turner House was taken over by the registered charity, Ffotogallery, and has subsequently been used for photography-based exhibitions. In 2014/15 the gallery became part of a wider Artes Mundi exhibition, staging works by Icelandic artist Ragnar Kjartansson and Croatian artist Sanja Iveković for Artes Mundi 6.

In 2018 Ffotogallery announced that it will be leaving Turner House for new premises in the centre of Cardiff, starting in July 2019. 
 
In July 2018 Penarth Town Council launched an online community consultation survey regarding the future use of Turner House and other buildings. In 2021 the gallery reopened with Penarth Town Council working in partnership with Amgueddfa Cymru–National Museum Wales to use the building as multi-purpose cultural venue.

The gallery regularly hosts Hayward Gallery touring exhibition shows.

Exhibitions 
A selection of exhibitions held at the gallery include:

 Sue Hunt. 1996.
 Paul Seawright (Ffotogallery). 2003.
 Eduardo Paolozzi: General Dynamic F.U.N. 20th January - 13th Feb 2022.
 Self Help Show: Penarth illustrator Chris Glynn and poet Luca Paci. 10th February - 5th March 2023.
 Claude Cahun: Beneath this Mask. 9 March - 23 April 2023.

References

External links
 Turner House
 
 

Art galleries established in 1888
Art museums and galleries in Wales
Buildings and structures in Penarth
Photography museums and galleries in Wales
Grade II listed buildings in the Vale of Glamorgan
Museums in the Vale of Glamorgan
Grade II listed museum buildings